Scarlet Heart (lit. Startling by Each Step) is a 2011 Chinese television series based on the novel Bu Bu Jing Xin by Tong Hua. It premiered in China on Hunan Broadcasting System (HBS) on 10 September 2011.

The series tells the story of a modern-era woman, Zhang Xiao, who time-travelled from the 21st century to the Qing Dynasty during Emperor Kangxi's reign, where she, as her previous incarnate Ma'er'tai Ruoxi, encountered the Emperor's sons, who were involved in a lengthy battle for the throne. During the course of the series, the female protagonist would meet and eventually fell in love with Fourth Prince Aisin Gioro Yinzhen, who would later on ascend the throne as Emperor Yongzheng. The plot of the series was largely reminiscent of the original novel's plot, though the series's ending differed from that of the novel, along with a few minor differences from both the series and novel.

A pioneer of the time slip genre in Asian television, Scarlet Heart was a commercial and critical hit, both in China and across Asia. A "sequel", Scarlet Heart 2 first aired in China on Zhejiang TV on 22 April 2014.

Synopsis

Zhang Xiao (Cecilia Liu), a young woman from the 21st century, suffers a near-fatal accident that sends her back in time to the Qing Dynasty during the Kangxi Emperor's (Damian Lau) reign. She finds herself trapped in the body of one of her previous incarnations: Ma'ertai Ruoxi, the teenage daughter of a Manchu general. In this new timeline, she has an elder sister, Ruolan (Annie Liu), who is a concubine of the Kangxi Emperor's eighth son, Yinsi (Kevin Cheng). Ruoxi initially tries to return to the future, but she soon adjusts to life in this era. She meets some of Kangxi's other sons, including the fourth prince Yinzhen (Nicky Wu), tenth prince Yin'e (Ye Zuxin) who falls in love with her, and fourteenth prince Yinti (Lin Gengxin). She also forges a close friendship with the thirteenth prince, Yinxiang (Yuan Hong).

Ruoxi attracts the attention of the emperor with rumors of her brashness and bravery, and manages to charm him with her intelligence and wit. Later, at the imperial palace's "beauty draft" (during which concubines and wives are chosen for the princes or the emperor himself), conflicting arrangements are made by Yinsi and his first wife, Gogoro Minghui (Shi Xiaoqun), leading to Ruoxi being drafted into the service of the dowager empress to keep the peace. Ruoxi is given an appointment as a servant to the emperor himself, specifically to prepare and serve tea to him and those he hosts.

During Ruoxi's stay in Yinsi's house, Yinsi falls in love with her. She initially rejects him but eventually returns his feelings, and later agrees to marry him if he gives up competing for the succession to the throne. This is because Ruoxi's knowledge of history makes her aware that Yinsi's ambition will ultimately lead to his death in prison after Yinzhen becomes emperor. However, Yinsi refuses to and thus Ruoxi breaks up with him. Before leaving, Ruoxi warns Yinsi of Yinzhen's plans to usurp the throne and came up with solutions for him to prevent being taken down by Yinzhen.

Ruoxi then started to get closer to Yinzhen, and their interactions changed her unfavorable opinion of him, and she unwittingly falls in love with him. Meanwhile, Yinsi and his supporters, acting on Ruoxi's advice, frame Yinzhen for plotting against the crown prince Yinreng (Zhang Lei). Yinxiang steps forward to take responsibility and is ultimately sentenced to house arrest. After this incident, Yinsi realizes that Ruoxi is now romantically involved with Yinzhen. Yinreng is deposed after his criminal ways are exposed and is imprisoned for life. Kangxi then begins showing preference for Yinti and offers Ruoxi as a concubine to him. However, Ruoxi boldly defies the emperor's order, and as a penalty, she is demoted to the laundry department.

Ruoxi works within the laundry department for a number of years, and is offered some level of protection and special treatment by ways of the princes. Kangxi falls ill during this time, and when Ruoxi is brought back to the emperor's service by Eunuch Wang to prepare pastries and help stimulate Kangxi's appetite, he pardons her and restores her to her former role as his lead tea server.

Kangxi eventually dies of his illness, and with military support from Longkodo (Zhao Jialin) and Nian Gengyao (Xing Hanqing), Yinzhen falsely claims that Kangxi named him the successor, effectively staging a coup and taking the throne from Yinti to become the Yongzheng Emperor. Yinzhen then releases Yinxiang from custody and moves Ruoxi into his quarters, eventually consummating their relationship. He does not, however, marry her, as he wants to be able to live with her and see her every day—wives and concubines have their own estates between which the emperor must divide his time. Ruoxi is pleased enough with this arrangement, as she has always been reticent about marriage and enjoys seeing Yinzhen daily as well. Ruoxi's happiness, however, is marred by Yinzhen's paranoia and his ruthless persecution of Yinsi and his followers. She is often caught between the rivaling factions of Yinzhen and Yinsi.

When Gogoro Minghui tells Ruoxi that Yinsi acted against Yinzhen years ago because of her advice based on the knowledge of the future, she is shocked, and her despair causes her to miscarry Yinzhen's child and is unable to conceive again. Enraged, Yinzhen blames Yinsi and his wife, issuing an edict forcing them to divorce, which leads her to commit suicide. Ruoxi fears Yinzhen's punitive actions against his brothers and confesses the truth to him and Yinxiang. Yinzhen is stunned when he understands why Yinsi plotted against him and starts treating Ruoxi coldly. Ruoxi is unable to withstand the mental stress and asks Yinti to help her leave the palace. Yinsi knows that Yinzhen will not allow Ruoxi to leave and decides to intervene. He discloses details of his past romance with Ruoxi, and an angered Yinzhen eventually agrees to let Ruoxi and Yinti leave the Forbidden City.

Despite Yinti's excellent care, Ruoxi's emotional anguish deeply affects her health, and she begs him to send a letter to Yinzhen, requesting to see the emperor one last time before she dies. However, a misunderstanding between Yinzhen and Yinti causes the letter to be thrown aside unread. Ruoxi struggles to stay alive, but after three days, she concludes that Yinzhen's absence confirms that his love for her has ended, and she dies. When news of Ruoxi's death reaches Yinzhen, he rushes to Yinti's house, regretting his actions after learning that Ruoxi still loved him.

In the later years, Yinsi and Yintang (Han Dong) were imprisoned as Yinzhen blames them for everything that happened. Yinxiang went to visit them in prison and hands them poison, which was Ruoxi's request to him before she left the palace. Both Princes commit suicide and end their suffering. Yinxiang dies a few years later, followed shortly by Yinzhen himself, whose 12-year reign as Emperor was the shortest in Qing history. Yinti lives on but does not find another wife. Only Yin'e has a happy ending with his wife (Liu Yuxin) whom he grew to love, watching Qianlong Emperor ascend the throne.

Back in 2011, Zhang Xiao regains consciousness in a hospital and is informed that she had been in a coma for weeks. She wonders if her experiences in the past were real or just a dream. After recovering, Zhang researches the Qing Dynasty era, only to find that history remains on its proper course, and there are no records on Ma'ertai Ruoxi.  However, she later visits a museum where she recognizes some Qing Dynasty-era artifacts and sees a woman in a Kangxi Emperor portrait that resembles her. Meanwhile, a man who bears a striking resemblance to Yinzhen visits the exhibition and encounters Zhang Xiao but does not recognize her. The show ends with a cliffhanger of the man walking away as Zhang Xiao's tears start to fall.

Cast

Main 
 Cecilia Liu as Maer'tai Ruoxi (馬爾泰·若曦) / Zhang Xiao (張曉)  
A modern day 9-to-5 white-collar worker, who accidentally goes back in time from the 21st century to the Qing Dynasty as the teenage daughter of a Manchu general. Intelligent, witty and armed with the knowledge of history, she was able to quickly adapt to life in that era, and ended up befriending the various princes. 
 Nicky Wu as Yinzhen(胤禛)
The aloof and reserved fourth prince, known for his perceptive thinking and cruelty. In order to protect the people around him and driven by his mother's cold treatment toward him, Yinzhen decides to fight for the throne. He first became interested in Ruoxi when he noticed her avoiding him, and ultimately falls deeply in love with her. 
 Kevin Cheng as Yinsi (胤禩) 
The gentle and sweet eighth prince. Having been born to a lowly palace maid, Yinsi wants the respect of his fellow brothers and ministers, therefore driving him to seek ultimate power. He falls in love with Ruoxi, but gives up on her when he was asked to choose between the throne or his love. He later expresses his regret over this decision. 
 Yuan Hong as Yinxiang (胤祥) 
The rebellious and free-spirited thirteenth prince, who seeks a carefree live outside the palace. His easygoing and steadfast nature allowed him to relate to Ruoxi's 21st century mindset, and they become best friends.   
 Lin Gengxin as Yinti (允禵) 
The forthright and sincere fourteenth prince, and the favored son of Consort De. He is loyal to his brothers and cares for them. Although he dislikes Ruoxi initially because of her ultimatum to Yinsi, he ultimately falls in love with her, and marries her in order to bring her out of the palace.

Supporting

Emperor and Other Princes
 Damian Lau as the Kangxi Emperor (康熙) 
 Zhang Lei as Yinreng (胤礽), the crown prince
 Yang Xiaobo as Yinti (胤禔), the First Prince, he was jailed for life as he was found out by the Emperor that he's a culprit for cursing Yinreng to being deposed. 
 Chen Jingyu as Yinzhi (胤祉), the Third Prince, he spread rumours accusing the First Prince of using sorcery to overthrow Yinreng from his Crown Prince position, causing he lost favour from the Emperor.
 Wang Xiaodong as Yinqi (胤祺), the Fifth Prince 
 Han Dong as Yintang (胤禟), the Ninth Prince who is calculating and brusque. He is aligned with Yinsi and thinks of ways to help him plot against Yinzhen. 
 Ye Zuxin as Yin'e (胤礻我), the Tenth Prince who is cheerful and bumbling. He has an unrequited crush on Ruoxi, but the two later becomes close friends. 
 Qu Aohui as Hongshi (弘时), the third son of Yinzhen who stands against his father.

Royal ladies 
 Dai Chunrong as Consort De (德妃), Yinzhen and Yinti's mother
 Liu Jie as Consort Liang (良妃), Yinsi's mother 
 Mu Tingting as Lady Ula Nara (乌喇那拉氏), Yinzhen's first wife
 Lu Meifang as Consort Nian (年妃), Yinzhen's second wife and Nian Gengyao's sister 
 Shi Xiaoqun as Gororo Minghui (郭络罗·明慧), Yinsi's wife 
 Annie Liu as Ma'ertai Ruolan (马尔泰·若兰), Yinsi's second wife and Ruoxi's sister. She is unwillingly married to Yinsi, who loves her and thus led to her father killing her lover in a bid to get her married to Yinsi.  
 Liu Yuxin as Gororo Mingyu (郭络罗·明玉), Yin'e's wife 
 Li Linlin as Lady Fuca (富察氏), Yinxiang's wife 
 Chai Wei as Princess Chenghuan (承欢), Yinxiang and Lüwu's daughter

Ministers and servants
 Xing Hanqing as Nian Gengyao (年羹尧), a trusted minister of Yinzhen and Consort Nian's brother
 Zhao Jialin as Longkodo (隆科多), a trusted minister of Yinzhen
 Gao Sen as Li Guangdi (李光地), a trusted minister of Emperor Kangxi 
 Ye Qing as Yu Tan (玉檀), a tea servant under Ruoxi who is the ninth prince's spy 
 Deng Limin as Li Dequan (李德全), head of the internal department who serves Emperor Kangxi 
 Zhou Yancheng as Wang Xi (王喜), Li Dequan's disciple 
 Cao Xinye as Qiao Hui (巧慧), Ruolan and Ruoxi's maid 
 Qi Qinglin as Li Fu (李福), a eunuch who serves Yinsi 
 Hu Zhonghu as Gao Wuyong (高无庸), a eunuch who serves Yinzhen and later becomes the new head of internal department 
 Shen Baoping as Zhang Qianying (张千英), the head of the washing department 
 Lian Teyue as Imperial Physician He (何太医)
 Kang Mingtong as Yun Xiang (芸香)
 Huo Dongdong as Yan Ping (艳萍) 
 Zao Yang as Xiao Shunzi (小顺子) 
 Ji Xue as Mei Xiang (梅香)
 Guo Jinying as Ju Yun (菊韵)

Mongolians
 Guo Xiaoting as Princess Suwan Guwalgiya-Minmin (苏完瓜尔佳·敏敏), a Mongolian princess who falls in love with Yinxiang  
 Ba Sen as King Suwan-Guwalgiya (苏完瓜尔佳王爷) 
 Zheng Kai as Prince Irgen Gioro Zuoying (伊尔根觉罗·佐鹰)

Others
 Guo Zhenni as Lüwu (绿芜), a courtesan and the love interest and confidante of Yinxiang. She ultimately kills herself when she realizes that her lowly birth will hinder Yinxiang's future endeavors. 
 Wang Xiaodong as Chang Qingshan (常青山), Ruolan's lover who was killed by her father.  
 Ma Tianyu as Huang Di (黄棣), Zhang Xiao's present-day boyfriend.

Deviations from the novel

The show's producers have announced that the series will remain mostly faithful to Bu Bu Jing Xin, the novel by Tong Hua on which it is based. However, there are some differences:

In the novel's beginning, though in the television series Zhang Xiao remains a 25-year-old white-collar worker — her alter ego, Ma'ertai Ruoxi, was 13 years old, not 16. Another difference was that Zhang supposedly from the year 2005, not 2011.
In the novel, Ruoxi is unable to return to her own time and ultimately succumbs to her illness, while Yinzhen dies ten years later amid hopes of reuniting with Ruoxi after death. The story ends with Yinzhen's son Hongli's (whom he fathered with Lady Niohuru) ascension to the throne as the Qianlong Emperor. In the television series, after Ruoxi and Yinzhen's deaths, Ruoxi's soul returns to her incarnation in the 21st century. Whilst struggling to get over the trauma of her experiences of time travel, she encounters a man who resembles Yinzhen and is possibly a present-day incarnation of him. The man does not recognize her, though he did inquire her if they knew each other before making his leave. Zhang Xiao remains in guilt over everything that happened when she was Ma'ertai Ruoxi. She chooses not say anything and tearfully watches the man leave.

Soundtrack

Songs not included in the commercial release
Aide Lianyi (爱的涟漪; Love's Ripples) performed by Ailiya & Alicia [04:30]
Diaoke Aiqing (雕刻爱情; Sculpture of Love) performed by Zheng Jiajia [03:35]
Xuehua Hongmei (雪花红梅; Snowflakes and Red Plum Blossoms) performed by Gong Shujun [04:14]

Awards

International broadcast

Remake
Moon Lovers: Scarlet Heart Ryeo is a South Korean remake, directed by Kim Kyu-tae. It is the first Korean drama project for Universal Studios and has a budget of $13 million. It began airing on 29 August 2016 for 20 episodes. It received criticisms for its screenplay, direction and performances, but was well received overseas. In China, the series aired at the same time as its Korean broadcast on Youku and Mango TV, also, in Hong Kong on LeTV, and on ONE TV ASIA in Malaysia, Singapore and Indonesia under the title Scarlet Heart. Due to its simultaneous broadcast and extensive publicity campaign, including a fan-meeting with Kang Ha-neul before the premiere, the drama was well received in Singapore and Malaysia, and has 2.5 billion cumulative views on China's biggest video platform, Youku.

See also
Palace

References

External links
 

 
2011 Chinese television series debuts
2011 Chinese television series endings
Chinese romance television series
Chinese historical television series
Chinese time travel television series
Alternate history television series
Television shows about dreams
Cultural depictions of Chinese men
Television shows about reincarnation
Television shows based on works by Tong Hua (writer)
Television series by Tangren Media
Television series set in 2011
Television series set in the Qing dynasty
Hunan Television dramas
Television series about dysfunctional families
Television shows set in Beijing
Television shows set in Shenzhen
Television shows about spirit possession